Michael Dickinson may refer to:

 Michael Dickinson (artist) (born 1950), English artist 
 Michael Dickinson (biologist) (born 1963), American fly bioengineer
 Michael Dickinson (horseman) (born 1950), English racehorse trainer